The group stage of the 2005–06 UEFA Cup is the second stage of the competition proper. Group stage matches began on 20 October 2005 and concluded on 15 December 2005. The top three teams in each group progressed to the Round of 32, to be joined by the eight third-place finishers from the Champions League group stage.

Seedings
The following teams qualified for the group stage:

Tie-breaking criteria
Based on paragraph 6.06 in the UEFA regulations for the current season, if two or more teams are equal on points on completion of the group matches, the following criteria are applied to determine the rankings:

superior goal difference from all group matches played;
higher number of goals scored;
higher number of goals scored away;
higher number of wins;
higher number of away wins;
higher number of coefficient points accumulated by the club in question, as well as its association, over the previous five seasons.

Groups

Group A

All times CET

Group B

All times CET

Notes
Note 1: Maccabi Petah Tikva played their home matches at Ramat Gan Stadium in Tel Aviv District instead of their regular stadium, Municipal Stadium, Petah Tikva.

Group C

All times CET

Group D

All times CET

Group E

All times CET

Group F

All times CET

Group G

All times CET

Group H

All times CET

References

External links
Group stage standings

3
2005-06